Harry George Lennon (born 16 December 1994) is an English professional footballer who plays as a defender for Wrexham.

Career

Charlton Athletic
Born in Romford, England, Lennon joined Charlton Athletic's academy and once captained the U18 squad. In December 2012, Lennon signed his first professional contract at the club. One year later in December, Lennon signed a new contract with the club, which will keep him until June 2016.

Lennon made his first team debut for Charlton Athletic in the 1–0 FA Cup fourth round away win against Huddersfield Town, where he came on as a substitute for Cedric Evina in the first half. His performance left the away Charlton's supporters very impressed. After this, Lennon made his league debut for the club on 28 January 2014, however he could not prevent Charlton losing 3–0 to Doncaster Rovers.

On 22 July 2014 Lennon joined Cambridge United on loan until 3 January 2015, but was recalled to Charlton on 31 October 2014 after making only two league appearances for Cambridge and one Football League Trophy start.

On 27 November 2014, Lennon joined Gillingham on a youth loan deal. After three matches as an un-used substitute, Lennon made his Gillingham debut, playing 90 minutes, in a 2–1 win over Colchester United on 26 December 2014. After making two appearances for the club, Lennon made his return to his parent club in January 2015.

On 2 October 2015, Lennon re-joined Gillingham on a one-month youth loan deal. Subsequently, the loan was extended until 12 December 2015. On 20 November 2015, Lennon returned to Charlton Athletic and signed a new two and a half year contract. He became a regular in the side playing in the Championship.

He signed a new one-year contract with Charlton at the end of the 2017–18 season.

Southend United
On 22 June 2018, Lennon signed a permanent deal with Southend United.

In November 2019, Lennon faced criticism after a video emerged of him with an opposition player in a pub after a defeat in the FA Cup against Dover Athletic, who were two divisions below Southend at the time. He was made to train with the youth team and was dropped for Southend's next match. In December he suffered a suspected broken leg in a game against Bolton Wanderers.

Wrexham
On 22 July 2021, Lennon signed a one-year deal with Wrexham. Following defeat in the play-offs, Lennon signed a new one-year contract with the club ahead of the 2022–23 season.

Career statistics

Club

References

External links

1994 births
Living people
Footballers from Romford
English footballers
Association football defenders
Charlton Athletic F.C. players
Cambridge United F.C. players
Gillingham F.C. players
Southend United F.C. players
Wrexham A.F.C. players
English Football League players